London's last tram week refers to the events surrounding the last full week of operation of London's first-generation street tram system. The week in question ran from 29 June to 5 July 1952. It was the culmination of a three-year programme, known as Operation Tramaway, that saw the replacement of south London's entire tram network with a fleet of modern diesel buses, at a cost of £10 million. The trams had been very popular among Londoners, and in south London they accounted for the majority of local journeys by public transport. Many people regarded their demise as a particularly momentous event. On the last day of operation, large crowds gathered to see the last trams in service and to take a final ride. On arrival at its depot, the very last tram was ceremoniously received by a group of dignitaries, watched by a large number of spectators.

Background

Street tramways in London date from 1861, when the American entrepreneur, George Francis Train, launched two speculative horse-drawn routes in the city. The services were withdrawn in June 1862 after Train was prosecuted for damaging the highway.

In 1870, Parliament passed the Tramways Act, which provided a legal framework for the construction and operation of tramways. It required trams to run in grooved rails flush with the road surface, thus allowing other vehicles to share the routes. The Act allowed local authorities to grant concessions to tramway operators, who would construct the tracks and maintain the public highway.

The Tramways Act stimulated the construction of new tram routes throughout London. By 1880, there were 63 miles of track, with 479 cars and 4,178 horses. Some 64 million passengers were carried that year. The lines all used a standard gauge of 4 ft 8½ in (1,435 mm; the same as the standard railway gauge) to permit inter-company working.

In 1901, electric trams started to replace horse-drawn vehicles. The first electric service was operated by London United Tramways (LUT) in Shepherd's Bush, Kew and Acton. In 1903,  London County Council (LCC) electrified its line from Westminster and Blackfriars bridges to Tooting. In contrast to the LUT system, which relied on overhead wires for its power supply, the LCC line drew power from a conduit sunk between the rails.

Electric trams were popular with Londoners, ridership was high and the system expanded rapidly. In 1911, two out of every three public transport journeys were made by tram. By 1914, the London tram network was the largest in Europe. In 1933, the London Passenger Transport Board (LPTB) was established to operate local public transport in London. The Board acquired 167 miles of track from the LCC, and a further 92 miles from other operators. 

But despite its popularity, the system suffered  serious drawbacks. The routes were inflexible, and, because of  the high capital costs involved, could not economically be extended to serve new suburbs. Maintenance of the tracks was also expensive. Trams were also seen as a cause of traffic congestion, especially in London's narrow streets.

In 1931, the LUT converted 17 of its route miles to trolleybuses. These proved more popular than the trams, with ridership increasing by 25% on some of the routes. Between 1935 and 1940, the LPTB converted nearly all of the tram routes north of the Thames to trolleybuses. When the conversion programme was paused in 1940 because of World War II, the only tram routes remaining were those south of the Thames and three cross-river routes that used the Kingsway Tunnel.

Operation Tramaway

The LPTB's first annual report after the war referred to "the urgent necessity for replacing trams in south London by a more modern and attractive form of transport". In 1946, the Board announced that the remaining trams would be replaced by diesel buses rather than trolleybuses. This was partly because the power-generating plant used by both trams and trolleybuses was nearing the end of its life, and partly because the economics of bus operation was moving in favour of diesel rather than electric.

In 1949, Lord Latham, chairman of the London Transport Executive, announced that the replacement of the remaining trams by buses would begin in October 1950 and would cost £10 million. Because it was constrained by the supply of new vehicles and of garage accommodation, it would be carried out in stages over the next three years. The programme was code-named Operation Tramaway.

The last day

The replacement programme reached its conclusion at the beginning of July 1952, with the fifth of that month, a Saturday, designated as the final day of tram operation in London. The event was widely foreshadowed in the press. Conductors issued souvenir tickets lettered, "Last Tram Week July 1952". The trams themselves carried posters reading, "Last Tram Week. On 5 July we say Goodbye to London."

Many Londoners regarded the disappearance of the trams as a particularly momentous event. On the final day, the trams were crowded with passengers wanting to take a last ride, with many more people lining the routes to say goodbye to the vehicles. Souvenir hunters stripped everything that could easily be removed from the cars.

The very last tram was car no. 1951, running on  the five-mile Route 40 from Woolwich to New Cross via Charlton and Greenwich. From New Cross to Greenwich it was driven by Driver Albert Fuller. At Greenwich, the Mayor of Deptford, Mr F. J. Morris, took over the controls. And John Cliff, a former tram driver from Leeds who was now deputy chairman of London Transport, drove the car for the final leg of the route into the New Cross depot. The journey was delayed by crowds of cheering spectators (20,000 of them, according to one report) who surrounded it along its route and followed it to the depot.

On its arrival at the depot, the tram was welcomed by a delegation of dignitaries led by Lord Latham and including Edwin Bayliss, chairman of the LCC, and the mayors of the nine boroughs that were affected by the conversion programme. A large crowd of spectators had also gathered in the depot. In a speech, Lord Latham said, "In the name of Londoners and London Transport, I say goodbye, old tram,". He said that the trams had taken "an honourable place in the history of the metropolis" and had given the Londoner "seven-league boots". The crowd then sang Auld Lang Syne and gave three cheers.

Aftermath

Once the replacement programme was completed, most of the tram cars were scrapped, although about 90 of them  were transferred to Leeds, where they gave several more years of service. A few of the cars were preserved and are now on display at the London Transport Museum and the National Tramway Museum. The trolleybuses that had replaced the trams north of the Thames were themselves replaced by diesel buses between 1959 and 1962.

The withdrawal of tram services in London was generally considered successful in reducing traffic congestion, at least in the short term. According to various press reports, traffic now flowed freely at what had previously been the worst bottlenecks. Some journeys by public transport were also noticeably faster. Lord Latham wrote, "The changes in traffic conditions at a number of key points are little short of dramatic." A decrease in road accidents was also reported.

References

Notes

Citations

Bibliography

 
 

 
History of transport in London